The Cook Islands national football team is the men's football team that represents the Cook Islands in international competition since 1971. It is governed by the Cook Islands Football Association which is part of the Oceania Football Confederation (OFC) and FIFA.

The nation has participated in seven FIFA World Cup qualification attempts since their first attempt back in 1998. They have qualified for the OFC Nations Cup twice in 1998 and 2000 OFC Nations Cup with both appearances seeing no wins from their four games that they have played.

History

Beginnings (1971–1995)
Despite being absent from the first three editions of the South Pacific Games, the geographical proximity of the Cook Islands with French Polynesia, host of the 1971 South Pacific Games, allowed the Cookian team to take part in the tournament. In the first round they were defeated 16–1 by Papua New Guinea and 30–0 by Tahiti, while in the match for fifth place, they fell to Fiji 15–1.

They next played a match in 1995 when proximity allowed them to participate again in the 1995 South Pacific Games. During the tournament they earned their first win, a 2–1 win over Wallis and Futuna, but lost their other four clashes resoundingly.

The two OFC Nations Cup (1996–2001)
The Cook Islands qualified for their first Oceania Nations Cup after finishing second in the 1998 Polynesia Cup, which they hosted. They faced Australia and Fiji in Group B, in what proved to be a tough draw. Australia crushed the Cook Islands 16–0 in their first match, scoring eight goals either side of the interval. In their next match against Fiji, however, the Cook Islands acquitted themselves much better, losing only 3–0, but with two defeats from two matches they failed to make the semi-finals.

In finishing 2nd at the 2000 Polynesia Cup, the Cook Islands also qualified for the OFC Nations Cup. They were drawn in Group A along with the Solomon Islands, and again, Australia. After their heavy defeat at the hands of Australia in the previous tournament, the Cook Islands hoped to avoid a repeat performance. However, they were powerless to prevent their opponents from running rampant, this time to the tune of 17–0. The Solomon Islands were up next, and in this game the Cook Islands had the consolation of scoring their first goal at the Oceania Nations Cup – the only bright spot in an otherwise bleak 5–1 defeat. After two defeats, then, the Cooks Islands again went out at the group stage.

Decline (2002–present)
They next entered qualification for the 2004 tournament however they lost all four matches and failed to progress.

They returned to the South Pacific Games for the 2007 competition where they could only beat Tuvalu 4–1. Four years later, at Nouméa 2011, they defeated Kiribati 3–0, but lost their other three meetings; while in 2012 OFC Nations Cup qualification they drew with American Samoa and fell to Samoa and Tonga.

In the 2016 OFC Nations Cup qualifiers, they beat Tonga 3–1 and Samoa 1–0, but fell in the last game against American Samoa 2-0, which relegated the Cook Islands to third place, surpassed on goal difference by both Samoas.

In March 2022, the Cook Islands played their first match in seven years when they lost 2–0 to the Solomon Islands in qualifying for the 2022 FIFA World Cup. However, they had to withdraw from their remaining matches due to a COVID-19 outbreak.

Kit sponsorship

Source:

Results and fixtures

In March 2022, the Cook Islands played their first match since they took part in the first round of qualifying for the 2018 FIFA World Cup in 2015.

Recent results

Coaches

 Alex Napa (1996–1998)
 Luigi McKeown (2001–2004)
 Tim Jerks (2004–2010)
 Shane Rufer (2011)
 Paul Farrell-Turepu (2011–2014)
 Drew Sherman (2015–2017)
 Kevin Fallon (2018–2020)
 Alan Taylor (2022)

Current squad
The following players were called up for the 2022 FIFA World Cup qualification matches in March 2022.

Caps and goals are correct as of 17 March 2022, after the match against Solomon Islands.

Player records

Most capped players

Top goalscorers

Competition record

FIFA World Cup

OFC Nations Cup

Pacific Games

Head-to-head record

See also
 Cook Islands national under-20 football team
 Cook Islands national under-17 football team
 Cook Islands women's national football team
 Cook Islands women's national under-17 football team

References

External links
 Cook Islands Football Association
 Oceania Football Federation
 Cook Islands at FIFA.com
 Pictorial History of Cook Island Football Kits

 
Oceanian national association football teams